

OVERVIEW
Located in Penjaringan, North Jakarta, Indonesia, Pantai Indah Kapuk (PIK) is a seaside township by the Jakarta Bay on the Java Sea. The growing township sprawls over 4,000-hectare filled with residential areas (landed houses, low-rise and high-rise), travel and lifestyle destinations, public and hospitality facilities, central-business district, commercial and retail areas, and community and urban-green spaces. 

Within the past two decades, Pantai Indah Kapuk has always been a go-to place for offering unique culinary and trendy hangout spots. Today, the township sees more integration with a comprehensive list of thematic lifestyle destinations and signature events, expanding Pantai Indah Kapuk to include more local and global communities. It is one of the prestigious residential areas in Jakarta along with Menteng, Pondok Indah, and Puri Indah that can be accessed from Jakarta Airport Toll Road Soekarno-Hatta and Jakarta Outer Ring Road.

HISTORY

Pantai Indah Kapuk started from the first phase (PIK1) in the early 2000s before moving to Golf Island and Riverwalk Island in the northern part of Jakarta. This development by Agung Sedayu Group and Salim Group continuously grow to the second phase (PIK2) in Tangerang, Banten Province, and beyond.

ACCESS

Pantai Indah Kapuk (PIK) is a pedestrian-friendly area between the integrated travel destinations. Visitors can also travel with the TransJakarta bus system on the 1A route via Balai Kota to Jalasena Timur (Golf Island PIK), or via the commuter train to the Stasiun Kota station before hopping to the TransJakarta. Getting around the PIK area is also possible with the PIK2 commuter line.

There are also a few external shuttle services to the township connecting Pantai Indah Kapuk with other areas in Jakarta. An electric bus service is in the pipeline to run between Sedayu City, Kelapa Gading and Pantai Indah Kapuk later in 2023. 

Moreover, toll road access is available through Inner Ring Road system and the Soekarno-Hatta International Airport directly to the PIK1 area. The upcoming PIK2 Interchange Toll will connect PIK2 with the Airport and the Inner and Outer Ring Road tolls, scheduled to open by end of 2023.

DESTINATIONS AND FACILITIES
From PIK1 to Golf Island, Riverwalk Island, and PIK2, Pantai Indah Kapuk bills itself as an integrated smart township. With comprehensive destinations and facilities supporting a growing urban population, the seaside area constantly improves itself from a long track record—dubbing PIK2 as: "The New Jakarta City".

HOLISTIC INITIATIVE
Corporate Social Responsibility (CSR)

In collaboration with the Buddha Tzu Chi Indonesia Foundation, Agung Sedayu Group as the developer of Pantai Indah Kapuk regularly donate through the dedicated Celengan Bambu program, a food bank program for disaster relief, a mangrove-planting program around the area, vaccination programs at Tzu Chi Hospitals, and many more.

Environmental 

Pantai Indah Kapuk works with the local government to help maintain the mangrove forests around its coastal line to care for the environment. Its polder system additionally uses seawalls to help preserve the Jakarta Bay area and prevent flooding from the sea. During the development, plans for flooding prevention systems in the PIK area also connect with the surrounding area to create a better ecosystem.

In tandem, the Greenbelt area provides urban green spaces to act as the city’s green lungs and water reservoir at the Tahang River directly connected to the Java Sea. Implementing a greener lifestyle, Greenbelt PIK has become the community hub to gather and enjoy outdoor activities, such as running, yoga, bicycling, rollerblading, stand-up paddle and even swimming at the clean, regularly maintained Tahang River.

Further supporting the healthy lifestyle, PIK continues its pursuit to build greener buildings. Central Market PIK, the first retail building in Indonesia, has achieved the advanced EDGE Certification from Green Building Council Indonesia and recognition in 2021 from PropertyGuru Awards Asia for “Best Boutique Retail Architectural Design”. Batavia PIK will be the next destination to have an Environmentally Sustainable Design. Inspired by the Old Batavia city as a maritime trading hub to celebrate Indonesia’s diversity and heritage, this destination will be the melting pot recognized by PropertyGuru Asia Awards in 2022 as “Best Retail Development”.

Small-Medium Enterprises (SMEs)

Various destinations around Pantai Indah Kapuk provide venues for local small-medium enterprises as a support to create job opportunities for the surrounding areas. At the center of Golf Island PIK, Pantjoran PIK is the place for Chinese-Peranakan heritage and Oriental culinary tenants, most notably the legendary establishments from around Indonesia to thrive and reconnect with a wider audience. Its authentic architecture design further enhances the atmosphere to provide a unique experience, thus, awarding Pantjoran PIK as the “Best Retail Architectural Design” from PropertyGuru Awards Asia in 2022. Nearby, By The Sea PIK support well-known local and international brands, especially from the rising young designers to grow and expand the diverse talents and products, at the first fashion district in North Jakarta.

Public Facilities 

Completing the residential and commercial areas, PIK offers various international-standard schools, universities, healthcare and sport centers, places of worship, transport hubs, urban green spaces, gas stations, solar-based power stations, water reservoir, recycling centers, and many more.

See also

References 

Shopping districts and streets in Indonesia
Tourist attractions in Jakarta
Red-light districts in Indonesia

External links 

Planned townships in Indonesia
Parks and lakes in Jakarta
North Jakarta